V